Land restoration, which may include renaturalisation or rewilding, is the process of ecological restoration of a site to a natural landscape and habitat, safe for humans, wildlife, and plant communities.  Ecological destruction, to which land restoration serves as an antidote, is usually the consequence of pollution, deforestation, salination or natural disasters. Land restoration is not the same as land reclamation, where existing ecosystems are altered or destroyed to give way for cultivation or construction. Land restoration can enhance the supply of valuable ecosystem services that benefit people.

Repairing damaged land
Land restoration can include the process of cleaning up and rehabilitating a site that has sustained environmental degradation, such as those by natural cause (desertification) and those caused by human activity (strip mining), to restore that area back to its natural state as a wildlife home and balanced habitat.

Countering desertification

Land reclamation in deserts involves
setting up reliable water provisioning (e.g. by digging wells or placing long-distance water pipes)
stabilizing and fixating the soil
Stabilizing and fixating the soil is usually done in several phases. 

The first phase is fixating the soil to such extent that dune movement is ceased. This is done by grasses, and plants providing wind protection such as shelterbelts, windbreaks and woodlots. Shelterbelts are wind protections composed of rows of trees, arranged perpendicular to the prevailing wind, while woodlots are more extensive areas of woodland.

The second phase involves improving/enriching the soil by planting nitrogen-fixating plants and using the soil immediately to grow crops. Nitrogen fixating plants used include clover, yellow mustard, beans, etc., and food crops include wheat, barley, beans, peas, sweet potatoes, date, olives, limes, figs, apricot, guava, tomato, certain herbs, etc. Regardless of the cover crop used, the crops (not including any trees) are each year harvested and/or plowed into the soil (e.g. with clover). In addition, each year the plots are used for  another type of crop (known as crop rotation) to prevent depleting the soil on specific trace elements.

A recent development is the Seawater Greenhouse and Seawater Forest. This proposal is to construct these devices on coastal deserts in order to create fresh water and grow food. A similar approach is the Desert Rose concept. These approaches are of widespread applicability, since the relative costs of pumping large quantities of seawater inland are low.  

Another related concept is ADRECS – a proposed system for rapidly delivering soil stabilisation and re-forestation techniques coupled with renewable energy generation.

See also
Land rehabilitation
Environmental restoration
Reforestation, Forest restoration, Forest landscape restoration
Restoration ecology
Farmer-managed natural regeneration
Floodplain restoration
Riparian zone restoration
Stream restoration
Daylighting (streams)
Mine reclamation
Soil salinity control, restoration of saline land
Bonn Challenge
Rewilding (conservation biology)

References

External links

"Degraded Land Restoration". Regeneration.org. 2021.

Ecological restoration
Environmental soil science
Conservation projects